Zeehond (Dutch: Seal) was a  of the Royal Netherlands Navy.

Ship history
The submarine was laid down on 30 December 1954 at the Rotterdamse Droogdok Mij shipyard in Rotterdam and launched on 20 February 1960. 16 March 1961 she was commissioned in the Dutch navy.

In November 1963 the boat was visited by the than Princess Beatrix of the Netherlands.
Between 1966 and 1967 Zeehond was modernized.
In 1970 the boat made two trips to Scotland and a trip to France where her sonar was adjusted in Lorient.
In January 1971 repairs on her propulsion are performed at the dry-dock of the Rotterdamse Droogdok Mij. After that she practices with her sister  in the Bay of Biscay. Later that year in February she exercises of the Orkney, Shetland and Faroe Islands. Also a trip to the United States was made that year.
The boat practiced with the surface fleet in January 1972. In October 1976 the boat made a visit to Dundee.

From 2 to 21 July 1978 Zeehond, Dolfijn,  and  practiced firing exercises.
In 1980 the boat made a trip to the Mediterranean Sea that lasted three months. On 11 January 1990 the Zeehond was de decommissioned.
December 1997 the boat was scrapped at the yard of the Rotterdamse Droogdok Mij.

References

1960 ships
Ships built in Rotterdam
Dolfijn-class submarines
Submarines built by Rotterdamsche Droogdok Maatschappij